Saarlouis is an electoral constituency (German: Wahlkreis) represented in the Bundestag. It elects one member via first-past-the-post voting. Under the current constituency numbering system, it is designated as constituency 297. It is located in western Saarland, comprising the Merzig-Wadern district and most of the district of Saarlouis district.

Saarlouis was created for the inaugural 1957 federal election after the accession of Saarland to Germany. Since 2021, it has been represented by Heiko Maas of the Social Democratic Party (SPD).

Geography
Saarlouis is located in western Saarland. As of the 2021 federal election, it comprises the Merzig-Wadern district and the Saarlouis district excluding the Lebach and Schmelz municipalities.

History
Saarlouis was created in 1957, then known as Saarlouis – Merzig. It acquired its current name in the 1965 election. In the 1957 and 1961 elections, it was constituency 245 in the numbering system. In the 1965 through 1998 elections, it was number 246. Since the 2002 election, it has been number 297.

Originally, the constituency comprised the Merzig-Wadern district and the Saarlouis district excluding the Ämter of Bous/Saar, Lebach, Schmelz, and Wadgassen. In the 1965 through 1972 elections, it lost the municipality of Schwalbach from the Saarlouis district. In the 1976 through 1998 elections, it acquired a configuration similar to its current borders, but lacking the municipalities of Bous, Ensdorf, Schwalbach, and Wadgassen from the Saarlouis district. It acquired its current borders in the 2002 election.

Members
The constituency was first represented by Albert Baldauf of the Christian Democratic Union (CDU) from 1957 to 1965, followed by fellow CDU member Josef Schmitt from 1965 to 1976. Hans-Werner Müller of the CDU was then representative from 1976 to 1990. Ottmar Schreiner of the Social Democratic Party (SPD) was elected in 1990 and served until 2009. Peter Altmaier of the CDU was representative from 2009 to 2021. Heiko Maas won the constituency for the SPD in 2021.

Election results

2021 election

2017 election

2013 election

2009 election

References

1957 establishments in West Germany
Constituencies established in 1957
Merzig-Wadern
Saarlouis (district)
Federal electoral districts in Saarland